Essex Park is a  public park in Portland, Oregon's Foster-Powell neighborhood, in the United States. The park was acquired in 1940. The park is the neighborhood's largest and features a playground, baseball field, basketball and tennis courts, and a splash pad. A mural was added in 2018.

References

External links
 

1940 establishments in Oregon
Foster-Powell, Portland, Oregon
Parks in Portland, Oregon